The following radio stations broadcast on AM frequency 1410 kHz: The Federal Communications Commission classifies 1410 AM as a regional frequency in the United States.

Argentina
 Radio Folclorísimo in José León Suárez, Buenos Aires.
 Radio Fundación in Rafael Calzada, Buenos Aires.

Canada

Mexico
 XEAS-AM in Nuevo Laredo, Tamaulipas
 XEBS-AM in Mexico City
 XEKB-AM in Guadalajara, Jalisco

United States

Uruguay
 CX 44 AM Libre in Montevideo

References

Lists of radio stations by frequency